Robert Jervis (April 30, 1940 – December 9, 2021) was an American political scientist who was the Adlai E. Stevenson Professor of International Politics in the Department of Political Science at Columbia University. Jervis was co-editor of the Cornell Studies in Security Affairs, a series published by Cornell University Press.

He is known for his contributions to political psychology, international relations theory, nuclear strategy, and intelligence studies. According to the Open Syllabus Project, Jervis is the twelfth most-frequently cited author on college syllabi for political science courses.

Early life and education
Robert Jervis was born in 1940. He earned a Bachelor of Arts degree from Oberlin College in 1962. At Oberlin, he developed an interest in nuclear strategy, and was influenced by Thomas Schelling’s Strategy of Conflict and Glenn Snyder’s Deterrence and Defense. In 1962, he started his studies at University of California, Berkeley, where he studied under Glenn Snyder. He was awarded a PhD from the University of California, Berkeley, in 1968.

Career 
From 1968 to 1972, he was an assistant professor of government at Harvard University and was an associate professor from 1972 to 1974. According to Jervis, Schelling brought him to Harvard. At Harvard, he developed a close friendship with Schelling and Kenneth Waltz. From 1974 to 1980, he was a professor of political science at the University of California, Los Angeles. He was a member of the Columbia University faculty from 1980 until his death in 2021. He was a member of the Arnold A. Saltzman Institute of War and Peace Studies in the School of International and Public Affairs.  He was president of the American Political Science Association in 2000–2001.

Jervis consulted for the CIA.

He worked on perceptions and misperceptions in foreign policy decision making. Jervis played a key role in introducing insights from psychology to International Relations scholarship. Charles Glaser described Jervis's work on the security dilemma as "among the most important works in international relations of the past few decades."

According to Jack Snyder, "Jervis's body of thought can be categorized in terms of five interrelated themes: communication in strategic bargaining, perception and misperception in international politics, cooperation in anarchy, the nuclear revolution, and complex system effects and unintended consequences." According to Thomas J. Christensen and Keren Yarhi-Milo, "in seeking to understand both behavior and outcomes in world affairs, Jervis championed the role of individuals’ perceptions and formative experiences rather than just broad political, social, and economic forces... [His] work was always rooted in the complexities of actual decision-making by real people with quirks and flaws."

Jervis was a member of the American Association for the Advancement of Science, the American Academy of Arts and Sciences, and the American Philosophical Society. In 2006 he was awarded the NAS Award for Behavior Research Relevant to the Prevention of Nuclear War from the National Academy of Sciences. He participated in the 2010 Hertog Global Strategy Initiative, a high-level research program on nuclear proliferation.

In 2021, he was elected member of the U.S. National Academy of Sciences. Jervis was the recipient of the 1990 University of Louisville Grawemeyer Award for Ideas Improving World Order.

Personal life and death
Jervis met his wife Kathe (née Weil) Jervis in 1961 on a student trip to the Soviet Union. Together they had two daughters, Alexa and Lisa. Lisa Jervis is a co-founder of Bitch magazine.

In the early 1960s, while studying for his PhD in Political Science at the University of California at Berkeley, Jervis participated in the Free Speech Movement.

Jervis died of lung cancer on December 9, 2021, at the age of 81.

Selected publications
Books
 The Logic of Images in International Relations (Princeton, 1970) 
 Perception and Misperception in International Politics (Princeton, 1976) 
 The Illogic of American Nuclear Strategy (Cornell, 1985) 
 The Meaning of the Nuclear Revolution (Cornell, 1989) 
 System Effects: Complexity in Political and Social Life (Princeton, 1997) 
 American Foreign Policy in a New Era (Routledge, 2005) 
 Why Intelligence Fails: Lessons From The Iranian Revolution And The Iraq War (Cornell, 2010) 
 How Statesmen Think: The Psychology of International Politics (Essay Collection) (Princeton, 2017) 

Articles

References

Further reading
 Utter, Glenn H. and Charles Lockhart, eds. (2002). American Political Scientists: A Dictionary (2nd ed.). .
 H-Diplo. Tribute to the Life, Scholarship, and Legacy of Robert Jervis: Part I.
 H-Diplo. Tribute to the Life, Scholarship, and Legacy of Robert Jervis: Part II

External links
 Teaching and Research Practices, Views on the Discipline, and Policy Attitudes of International Relations Faculty at U.S. Colleges and Universities
 An interview with Robert Jervis by Theory Talks

1940 births
2021 deaths
American political scientists
American international relations scholars
Political realists
Oberlin College alumni
University of California, Berkeley alumni
Columbia University faculty
Columbia School of International and Public Affairs faculty
20th-century American writers
Political psychologists
Members of the United States National Academy of Sciences
Deaths from lung cancer
Place of birth missing
Place of death missing